The Oregon Trail is an American western television series that aired on NBC from September 21 until October 26, 1977. The series was filmed in the Flagstaff, Arizona area.

Cast
Rod Taylor as Evan Thorpe
Andrew Stevens as Andy Thorpe
Gina Marie Smika as Rachael Thorpe
Darleen Carr as Margaret Devlin
Charles Napier as Luther Sprague
Tony Becker as William Thorpe

Episodes
NBC cancelled the show after six episodes, but the remaining seven episodes were later aired on BBC 2 in the UK, and the entire series was shown in the UK on BBC1, from November 1977 to January 1978.

Production
Terry Wilson (Bill Hawks in Wagon Train) served as production supervisor on the series, and series stars Rod Taylor and Charles Napier co-wrote the theme song, "Oregon Bound", with singer Danny Darst.

The budget for the series was a reported $380,000 an episode.

Home media
On April 13, 2010, Timeless Media Group (TMG) released the show on six DVDs, running 750 minutes.  The set includes 14 original episodes, including the feature-length pilot and the six episodes that did not air on NBC.

References

External links
 

1970s Western (genre) television series
1977 American television series debuts
1977 American television series endings
NBC original programming
Television series by Universal Television
Oregon Trail
Television shows set in Nebraska